Bicycling has been a popular activity in Minnesota since the late 19th century.  Since at least 2001, the state has claimed to have more miles of bike trails than any other in the U.S.  For 2017, Minnesota was ranked as the 2nd most bicycle-friendly state by the League of American Bicyclists, moving up from its 5th-ranked position in 2008 and 2009.  It was only exceeded by Washington.  Much of the state's bicycle culture is centered in Minneapolis, the state's largest city, but the extensive network of trails has helped make cycling common throughout the state.

Bicycling magazine called Minneapolis the country's #1 bike city in 2010.
Among the 50 U.S. cities with the largest workforces, Minneapolis has ranked #2 (behind Portland, Oregon) in percentage of bicycle commuters since 2007, according to the U.S. Census Bureau.  Among the largest 442 cities in the country, it ranked a more modest #15 that year.  However, commuting data only provides a small window into overall activity—nationally, only about 5% of cycling trips are for commuting to school or work.

Early history
Bicycles were an extremely popular means of personal transportation in the U.S. and Europe in the late 19th and early 20th centuries before the automobile became more widely available.  As in many other states, bicyclists in Minnesota were early backers of the Good Roads Movement.  Cyclists also formed clubs to gather and hold competitions.  In the 1890s, Minnehaha Park in Minneapolis became home to a mile-long cycling track that was used for racing.  Minneapolis was already building an extensive park system during this time, which was built upon during succeeding generations—including a significant amount of help during the Great Depression when the Civilian Conservation Corps made improvements.  Today, a nearly continuous system of parkways, bike paths, and pedestrian walkways encircle the city as the Grand Rounds Scenic Byway.  Other cities, particularly Twin Cities suburbs have also built large networks of bike paths, but it's an idea that has spread to other places such as Rochester, which has about as much park land as Minneapolis despite having a significantly smaller population.

The Minnesota Council of the American Youth Hostels organization (now known as Hostelling International USA) put on many outdoor activities for teenagers and other youths traveling through the state.  Some of these activities included bike trips in Minnesota and Wisconsin, and the organization has continued to promote cycling until today.  In 1967, they held the first  century ride in the state, the Minnesota Ironman (this occurred more than a decade before the first Ironman Triathlon).  In the 1980s, the Minnesota Council began selling the Minnesota Bike Atlas.  Eventually, a specific Twin Cities Bicycling Club was formed in 1993, and split off into a separate organization in 2001.  However, the two entities still cooperatively run the Minnesota Ironman event and produce the Minnesota Bike Atlas.

A bike boom and start of a trail system
Another bike boom occurred across the country in the 1960s and 1970s, as a combination of factors renewed interest in cycling.  Many bike shops in Minnesota were founded in this period, and began selling products from new companies.  Penn Cycle in the Twin Cities suburb of Richfield, which had been operating since the 1950s, became the first dealer for Trek bicycles in the late 1970s.  Erik's Bike Shop, another Richfield based chain (originally), opened its first store in 1977.  The state began building trails, often along former railroad alignments.  Minnesota has had a significant railroading history, but about half of the state's rail lines have been abandoned, opening the land up for new development.  The first paved rail trail in Minnesota was the Heartland State Trail, which opened in 1977.  Trail building has continued at a rapid pace since then, and many rural rail trails have been credited with reviving the small towns they serve.  The Root River Trail, for example, led the town of Lanesboro to open up a number of new hotels to host people riding the trail.

Trails have been built by many different organizations across the state.  While the Minnesota Department of Natural Resources (DNR) operates a system of State Trails, counties, cities, and non-profit organizations have also worked to build bike paths.  Most trails operated by the DNR are multi-use trails, supporting a range of activities including hiking, horseback riding, mountain biking, and wintertime activities like skiing and snowmobiling.  Minneapolis was also home to the Rollerblade company, which popularized inline skating in the 1980s.  Skaters also benefited from the trail system being built at the time, since they require smooth paved surfaces.

In the 1980s and 1990s, Minnesotans watched the rise of Greg LeMond, the first American to win the Tour de France.  While he was born in the southwestern United States, he moved to Minnesota in the mid-1980s.  He soon went on to win the Tour de France three times, in 1986, 1989, and 1990.

Recent history
The Yellow Bike Coalition formed in the Twin Cities in the mid-1990s and made the first major attempt at bike sharing in the region.  They created a network of locations with freely-available bikes, first in Saint Paul in 1995, and then in Minneapolis in 1998.  These were donated bicycles from the community that had been painted yellow, in an effort to discourage theft.  However, like most free bike-sharing attempts in the United States, the Yellow Bike Coalition eventually folded because it was unable to keep up with the number of bikes being stolen and vandalized.

The Yellow Bike program became largely inactive around the year 2000, and folded completely a few years later.  Some backers of the program went on to form the Sibley Bike Depot (now Cycles for Change) in Saint Paul in 2001, a non-profit community bike shop where people can come in and learn how to maintain and rebuild bikes.  Volunteers can earn credits toward purchasing a refurbished bike.

In 2010, a new attempt at bike sharing began with the opening of the Nice Ride Minnesota system.  It is modeled on successful programs in cities like Paris and Montreal where the BIXI bicycle and kiosk system has been used.  These bikes are purpose-built machines, rather than being recycled from the community, and the kiosk system requires payment.  It is hoped that this income will defray the cost of maintenance.

Minneapolis is also on a bike path building spree as of 2010, with more than a dozen routes planned for off-street paths, bike lanes, and bicycle boulevards.

U.S. Bicycle Route System
The United States Bicycle Route System, which primarily uses existing roads and trails, is in early planning stages.  According to an April 2010 plan, five routes would go through Minnesota, and all of the corridors are currently expected to go through the Twin Cities region.  The designated east–west corridors are U.S. Bicycle Route 10 (USBR 10), USBR 20 and USBR 30, while designated north–south corridors are USBR 41 and USBR 45.  USBR 45 would largely follow the present Mississippi River Trail, while USBR 41 would branch off near the Twin Cities and head through Duluth and up the North Shore of Lake Superior.

U.S. Bicycle Route 20 is actively being planned in Michigan and Wisconsin, though the Minnesota Department of Transportation only recently began planning routes for the system.  USBR 45 became the first route designated in Minnesota in 2012, and signage was completed in 2013.

See also
List of hiking trails in Minnesota
List of rail trails in Minnesota
List of shared-use paths in Minneapolis

References

 
Transportation in Minnesota